Athanasios 'Thanasis' Kostanasios (born 11 January 1999) is a Greek professional footballer who plays as a forward.

Honours
Olympiacos
Super League: 2019–20

References

1999 births
Living people
Greece youth international footballers
Super League Greece players
Olympiacos F.C. players
Ergotelis F.C. players
Association football forwards
Footballers from Piraeus
Greek footballers